Rikki Organ was an Australian entertainer. He died in 2016 after a seven year battle with cancer. Organ was well known on the Australian club circuit singing favourites by Elvis Presley, Johnny O'Keefe and others. Organ went on to win ten Mo Awards.

History
Rikki left his job as an electrician in Wollongong and found fame after winning Bert Newton's New Faces in the 1980s.

In 2009, Organ was diagnosed with multiple myeloma blood cancer. He died on 2 August 2016 and is survived by his wife Jane and two children, Taylor-Louise and Tyne-James.

Awards

Mo Awards
The Australian Entertainment Mo Awards (commonly known informally as the Mo Awards), were annual Australian entertainment industry awards. They recognise achievements in live entertainment in Australia from 1975 to 2016. Rikki Organ won ten awards in that time.
 (wins only)
|-
| 1985
| Rikki Organ
| Johnny O'Keefe Encouragement Award
| 
|-
| 2004
| Rikki Organ
| Compere of the Year
| 
|-
| 2006
| Rikki Organ
| Compere of the Year
| 
|-
| 2008
| Rikki Organ and the Organ Grinders
| Three or More Performer Band of the Year
| 
|-
|rowspan="2"| 2009
| Rikki Organ and the Organ Grinders
| Three or More Performer Band of the Year
| 
|-
| Rikki Organ
| Compere of the Year
| 
|-
|rowspan="2"| 2010
| Rikki Organ and the Organ Grinders
| Dance Band of the Year
| 
|-
| Rikki Organ
| Compere of the Year
| 
|-
| 2011
| Rikki Organ and the Organ Grinders
| Dance Band of the Year
| 
|-
| 2012
| Rikki Organ and the Organ Grinders
| Dance Band of the Year
| 
|-

References 

2016 deaths
Australian singers